Camille Lizette Vélez-Rivé (born February 5, 1968) is a United States district judge of the United States District Court for the District of Puerto Rico. She previously served as a United States magistrate judge of the same court.

Early life and education 

Vélez-Rivé was born on February 5, 1968, in San Juan, Puerto Rico. She received a Bachelor of Arts from Washington University in St. Louis in 1989 and a Juris Doctor, magna cum laude, from the University of Puerto Rico Law School in 1993.

Legal career 

Vélez-Rivé served as a law clerk for Justice Francisco Rebollo López of the Puerto Rico Supreme Court from 1993 to 1994. From 1994 to 1997, she was an associate at Pietrantoni Méndez & Alvarez in San Juan, Puerto Rico. From 1998 to 2004, she was an assistant United States attorney in the United States Attorney's Office for the District of Puerto Rico.

Federal judicial service

United States magistrate judge 
Vélez-Rivé served as a United States magistrate judge for the District of Puerto Rico from 2004 to 2022.

District court service 

On June 15, 2022, President Joe Biden nominated Vélez-Rivé to serve as a United States district judge of the United States District Court for the District of Puerto Rico. President Biden nominated Vélez-Rivé to the seat vacated by Judge Francisco Besosa, who assumed senior status on January 1, 2022. On July 13, 2022, a hearing on her nomination was held before the Senate Judiciary Committee. On August 4, 2022, her nomination was reported out of committee by a 14–8 vote. On November 30, 2022, the United States Senate invoked cloture on her nomination by a 54–43 vote. Later that day, her nomination was confirmed by a 55–42 vote. She received her judicial commission on December 9, 2022.

References

External links 

1968 births
Living people
20th-century American women lawyers
20th-century American lawyers
20th-century Puerto Rican lawyers
21st-century American women judges
21st-century American judges
21st-century American women lawyers
21st-century American lawyers
21st-century Puerto Rican lawyers
Assistant United States Attorneys
Hispanic and Latino American judges
Hispanic and Latino American lawyers
Judges of the United States District Court for the District of Puerto Rico
People from San Juan, Puerto Rico
Puerto Rican judges
Puerto Rican women lawyers
Washington University in St. Louis alumni
University of Puerto Rico alumni
United States district court judges appointed by Joe Biden
United States magistrate judges